Menlo Park Academy is a school for gifted children in grades K-8, in Cleveland, Ohio.

History

Menlo Park Academy was founded on September 23, 2008 with 38 students, and today enrolls nearly 700. The school has occupied three different buildings, currently situated in the Joseph and Feiss factory. The factory, which was previously abandoned, was renovated into the school it is today. Before the academy settled into its current building, the school was located at 14440 Triskett Road, next to St. Mel's.

Test Scores and Academics
Menlo Park Academy has high test scores, however, the students there generally have little growth from year to year. Academically, the school offers High School Courses for Spanish, Math, English, History, and Biology. In eighth grade, students may be recommended for ninth grade level courses. In math, they may take Algebra I, Geometry, Algebra II, and Precalculus. Students may be recommended for Algebra I as early as fifth grade. These high school courses may or may not be accepted by high schools, depending on the specific school's policies.

References

Education in Cleveland
Buildings and structures in Cleveland
Public elementary schools in Ohio
Public middle schools in Ohio
Gifted education